Tom Prince (October 26, 1968 – February 5, 2022) was an American professional bodybuilder. Prince won his IFBB pro card by winning the 1997 NPC National Championships (his only overall title) and remained competitive for five years, ending his career in 2002. His highest professional placing was the 2001 Night of Champions, where he finished third. Prince suffered from kidney issues, a rare disease caused by either hereditary causes, obesity or even drug abuse called focal segmental glomerulosclerosis forcing him to end his career relatively early. Tom received a kidney transplant in 2012, however it failed two years later, requiring him to undergo dialysis three times a week, each treatment lasted for 4 hours. After ending his bodybuilding career Tom (together with his wife) ran a successful property management business. He died on February 5, 2022, at the age of 53, from complications of cancer.

Statistics
Height: 5' 8" (1.72 m)

Competition Weight: 230 lbs (104 kg)

Off Season Weight: 300 - 317 lbs (136 – 144 kg)

Competitive history 
 1995 NPC Nationals – Heavyweight – 2nd
 1996 NPC Nationals – Heavyweight – 2nd
 1996 NPC USA Championships – Heavyweight – 2nd
 1997 NPC Nationals – Heavyweight and Overall – 1st
 1997 NPC USA Championships – Heavyweight – 9th
 1999 IFBB Night of Champions – 13th
 2000 IFBB Ironman Pro Invitational – 9th
 2001 IFBB Grand Prix England – 8th
 2001 IFBB Night of Champions – 3rd
 2001 Mr Olympia – 16th
 2002 IFBB Night of Champions – 7th
 2002 IFBB Southwest Pro Cup – 9th

See also 
List of male professional bodybuilders
List of female professional bodybuilders

References 

1968 births
2022 deaths
Prince, John
Prince,Tom